Jean-François is a French given name. Notable people bearing the given name include:

 Jean-François Carenco (born 1952), French politician
 Jean-François Champollion (1790–1832), French Egyptologist
 Jean-François Clervoy (born 1958), French engineer and astronaut
 Jean-François Corminboeuf (born 1953), Swiss sport sailor
 Jean-François Coulomme (born 1966), French politician
 Jean-François Dagenais (born 1975), Canadian music producer
 Jean-François David (born 1982), Canadian ice hockey player
 Jean-François Gariépy (born 1984), Canadian alt-right political commentator and former neuroscientist
 Jean-François Garreaud (1946–2020), French actor
 Jean-François de La Harpe (1739–1803), French critic
 Jean-François Lyotard (1924-1998), French philosopher
 Jean-François Marceau (born 1976), Canadian judoka
 Jean-François Marmontel (1723–1799), French historian and writer
 Jean-François Martial (1891–1977), Belgian actor
 Jean-François Millet (1814–1875), French painter
 Jean-François Papillon (died 1805), Haitian revolutionary
 Jean-François Parigi (born 1960), French politician
 Jean-François Racine (born 1982), Canadian ice hockey player
 Jean-François Rewbell (1747–1807), French politician
Jean-François Ricard (born 1956), French prosecutor of the National Terrorism Prosecution Office for the prosecution of terrorism in France
Jean-François Rousset (born 1952), French politician
 Jean-François Séguier (1703–1784), French astronomer and botanist

See also
 Jean-François, comte de Durat (1736–1830), French noble and military officer
 Jean L. François (1882–1941), French philatelist

Given names
Masculine given names
French masculine given names
Compound given names